Yiğitler is a village in the Nazımiye District, Tunceli Province, Turkey. The village is populated by Kurds of the Arel tribe and had a population of 73 in 2021.

The hamlets of Aşağı, Karamusa, Orta and Süleyman are attached to the village.

References 

Villages in Nazımiye District
Kurdish settlements in Tunceli Province